The Saint Sava Serbian Orthodox Monastery and School of Theology in Libertyville, Illinois is a monastery and professional theological school in the Serbian Orthodox Church in the USA and Canada. The school is a collocated facility with the monastery.

The school possesses a library of 8,000 titles.

History
The monastery was founded in 1923 by Montenegrin Serb Bishop Saint Mardarije as a school for the Serbian Orthodox Church. It is unique in North America among Orthodox seminaries for being linked to and deriving its traditional Orthodox ethos from a monastery out of which it grew.

Dionisije Milivojević was appointed the bishop of the American-Canadian Diocese in 1939. During World War II, the Libertyville monastery became an American refuge for Orthodox Serbs. In 1964, Serbian Patriarch German defrocked American Bishop Dionisije Milivojević over political and administrative issues. This forced a split between the Serbian and North American branches of the church. The result was two separate North American churches—the Serbian Orthodox Church in the USA and Canada in Libertyville and the Diocese of New Gracanica – Midwestern America in nearby Third Lake. The Illinois Supreme Court deemed that this schism was a violation of the mother church's regulations and forbade recognition of Bishop Dionisije. However, in 1976, the United States Supreme Court ruled that this was in violation of the First and Fourteenth Amendment to the United States Constitution in Serbian Orthodox Diocese v. Milivojevich.

Peter II of Yugoslavia, the last Yugoslav king, lived at the monastery after being exiled by Josip Broz Tito. He died at the church in 1970 and his will stipulated that he wished to be buried there. More than 10,000 attended his funeral. He lay there until his remains were repatriated to Serbia in 2013.

There is also a cemetery on the property. The monastery is listed on the National Register of Historic Places.

See also
 Serbs in USA
 Serbs in Canada
 Serbs in South America
 St. Pachomious Monastery
 New Gračanica Monastery
 Monastery of St. Paisius, Safford
 St. Xenia Serbian Orthodox Skete
 St. Archangel Michael Skete
 Saint Petka Serbian Orthodox Church
 St. Nilus Island Skete
 Trinity Chapel Complex better known as Saint Sava Cathedral in Manhattan, New York

References

Sources

External links
  Serbian Orthodox Church in the United States of America and Canada

Churches in Illinois
Serbian Orthodox monasteries in the United States
Educational institutions of the Serbian Orthodox Church
Eastern Orthodox seminaries
Eastern Orthodoxy in Illinois
Libertyville, Illinois
National Register of Historic Places in Lake County, Illinois
Education in Lake County, Illinois
Churches in Lake County, Illinois
Buildings and structures in Lake County, Illinois
Serbian-American culture in Illinois
Serbian schools outside Serbia
Serbian Orthodox Church in the United States